Mobilize is the second album by Grant-Lee Phillips after the internet release of Ladies Love Oracle. It was released to high critical acclaim, reviews often focusing on the successful implementation of both electronic textures and traditional instruments. Phillips himself played every instrument during recording and used a drum machine for percussion in every track except for "Hugo's Theme" and "Sunday Best" where other musicians contributed.

Track listing
All tracks composed by Grant-Lee Phillips
"See America"          5:08
"Humankind"          3:09
"Love's a Mystery"          4:09
"Sadness Soot"          4:20
"We All Get a Taste"          3:54
"Spring Released"          3:15
"Lazily Drowning"          4:18
"Like a Lover"          4:31
"Mobilize"          4:07
"Beautiful Dreamers"          4:27
"Sleepless Lake"          2:50
"April Chimes"    2:46

Australian Bonus Tracks

"Hugo's Theme"       0:46
"Sunday Best"       3:28

References

Grant-Lee Phillips albums
2001 albums
Rounder Records albums